Caenorhabditis elegans Cer1 virus is a species of retroviruses in the genus Metavirus.

References

External links 
 
 ICTVdB Index of Viruses
 Descriptions of Plant Viruses 

Metaviridae
RNA reverse-transcribing viruses
Caenorhabditis elegans